:30 Seconds is an Australian comedy series produced for The Comedy Channel which satirises Australian advertising companies and advertising industry. The name of the show comes from the advertising slots on television that are normally 30 seconds long. The show has had many guest appearances from famous Australians such as Claudia Karvan, Peter Helliar, Bridie Carter, Matthew Newton and Guy Pearce.

Plot
The show revolves around a fictitious advertising agency, BND which is a global advertising network, with 61 offices worldwide. The show takes place in one of the Australian offices.

Production

Location
The show was shot on location at the offices of real-life Sydney production company Blacksheep Productions, located in Mountain Street, Ultimo.

Lazzi
:30 Seconds occasionally has parts closely resembling a lazzi. This occurs sporadically throughout the show when Martin Manning sees a product. The product that Martin sees becomes centerpiece, while a culmination of the product in Martin's eyes, and how the product could be advertised. For example, the first use in the show occurs in the first scene, when Martin first looks at an Orange Juice container. Suddenly the packet animates and a stereotypical advertising voice over sounds saying: "Now with added goodatives". The scene returns to normal after this brief lazzi, and the scene continues on.

Cast
 Joel Tobeck as Martin Manning
 Stephen Curry as McBaney
 Gyton Grantley as Sumo
 Kat Stewart as Marion West
 Peter O'Brien as Bill Brooker
 Jenna Lind as Kath Bullock
 Emily Brennan as Barbara Main
 Oliver Brookes as Joel

Episodes

See also

List of Australian television series

Notes

References

External links
:30 Seconds - Comedy Channel

Australian comedy television series
2009 Australian television series debuts
2009 Australian television series endings
The Comedy Channel original programming
Television series about advertising